Leony (born 25 June 1997 in Cham; born Leonie Burger) is a German pop singer and song writer.

Career 
Along with Julian Vogl and Maximillian Böhle, Leonie Burger performed on RTL's Rising Star as part of the band 'Unknown Passenger'. In the finale, they received 92.77% of the audience's vote for their version of Stay. She got to know her early band manager Nik Hafermann through the show. The band had a few appearances in smaller clubs, but the group disbanded shortly thereafter. Leonie performed as a solo artist from then on, using a slightly modified spelling of her first name as her stage name.

In 2016, Leony signed with Sony Music in Australia, subsequently undertaking a lot of vocal coaching. Her first songs were produced in Sweden, with her releasing her first debut single Surrender in 2017. The song was used in a Sylvie Meis underwear commercial. The single Boots was released in 2018, with More Than Friends following in 2019.

Thereafter, she moved over to a different brand, with Vitali Zestovskih and Mark Becker becoming her new managers and producers. Together with DJ duo Vize and Sam Feldt she released her new single Far Away from Home. Her breakthrough came in July 2020 with her remake of Modern Talking's song Brother Louie in collaboration with Vize, Kazakh artist Imanbek and the former Modern Talking member, Dieter Bohlen.

In 2022, she was a music mentor for Emilia and her song Outside and Inside in Dein Song, a reality television music competition on German broadcaster ZDF.

In 2023, Leony featured as a judge on the 20th season of German reality talent show Deutschland sucht den Superstar.

Personal Life 
Her brother is the professional football player Korbinian Burger. Leony lives in Berlin.

TV Shows 
 2014: Rising Star (as a participant)
 2023: Deutschland sucht den Superstar (as a judge)

Discography 
Main article - Leony - Discography (in German)

1 Crazy Love couldn't be included in the official German charts, but placed number 15th in the Single-Trend-Charts (28th October 2022).

Awards and Nominations

Awards 
New Music Awards

 2021: "Durchstarter/in des Jahres" (Up-and-Comer of the Year)

Nominations 
1 Live Krone

 2021: "Bester Dance Act" (Best Dance Act)
 2021: "Beste Single" (Best Single; for Faded Love)
 2022: "Beste Künstlerin" (Best Female Artist)
 2022: "Bester Song des Jahres" (Best Song of the Year; for Remedy)
 2022: "Bester Hip-Hop/R&B Song" (Best Hip-Hop/R&B Song; for Follow)

New Faces Awards

 2021: Music

References

External links 
Commons: Leony - A collection of photos, videos and audio files

1997 births
Living people
German pop singers
Reality music competition television series
German women singers